Ira Smith is an American public address announcer best known for his work for the Sacramento Kings of the National Basketball Association.

After leaving the military, Ira started his civilian career in radio management and sportscasting. Along the way Ira worked at WHLT in Columbia City, Indiana (4 years), WMRI AM and FM in Marion, Indiana (2 years) and WVMO in Monroe, Michigan where he also, for six years, broadcast University of Michigan football. 

Smith joined the Sacramento Kings staff in 2000 after the death of long-time Kings public address announcer Fred Anderson.  From 2000-2003, Smith was the main public address announcer for the team and from the 2003-2004 season onward, he shared the public address announcing duties with Scott Moak. 

Smith provided the voice of the Public Address Announcer in ESPN's NBA 2K2 video game and NBA 2K3 video game. 

Since 1976, Smith has been called the  Voice of Napa Valley Sports  for KVON and KVYN, covering many local sports. 

Smith has served as past president of the Kiwanis Club for Napa and past president of the Napa Valley Tennis Association. He received the Napa Chamber of Commerce "Volunteer of the Year" award.  He is an Ambassador for the Napa Chamber of Commerce. 

Smith was inducted into the Napa High School Athletic Hall of Fame on March 5, 2022. On September 10, 2022 the Vintage High School Athletic Hall of Fame and the Bay Area Radio Hall of Fame will induct Smith.

References

Year of birth missing (living people)
Living people
National Basketball Association public address announcers
Sacramento Kings personnel